Medusa Pool is a tidal lagoon which occupies the west side of the central lowlands of Candlemas Island in the South Sandwich Islands. The name, given by the UK Antarctic Place-Names Committee in 1971, is associated in classical mythology with the geomorphologically similar Gorgon Pool, nearby, Medusa being one of the gorgons.

References

Lagoons of subantarctic islands
Bodies of water of South Georgia and the South Sandwich Islands